D416 branches off to the south from the D414 near Ston towards Prapratno ferry port - providing ferry access to Sobra on island of Mljet and the D123 state road.

The road, as well as all other state roads in Croatia, is managed and maintained by Hrvatske ceste, state owned company.

Traffic volume 
Traffic is not regularly counted on the road, however, Hrvatske ceste report number of vehicles using Prapratno-Sobra ferry line, connecting D416 to the D123 state road. Furthermore, the D416 road carries some local traffic on Pelješac peninsula itself, which does use the ferry at all, substantially exceeding the ferried traffic. Substantial variations between annual (AADT) and summer (ASDT) traffic volumes are attributed to the fact that the road connects to a number of summer resorts.

Road junctions and populated areas

Sources

State roads in Croatia
Transport in Dubrovnik-Neretva County